St Oswald's Church may refer to any of a number of churches, mainly in the north of England:

Malta
 St Oswald's Church, Mtarfa

England

Cheshire/Wirral
 St Oswald's Church, Backford
 St Oswald's Church, Bidston, Wirral
 St Oswald's Church, Bollington
 St Oswald's Church, Brereton
 St Oswald's Church, Lower Peover
 St Oswald's Church, Malpas
 St Oswald's Church, Padgate, Warrington
 St Oswald's Church, Winwick
 St Oswald's Church, Worleston

Cumbria
 St Oswald's Church, Burneside
 St Oswald's Church, Dean
 St Oswald's Church, Kirkoswald, Cumbria
 St Oswald's Church, Grasmere
 St Oswald's Church, Ravenstonedale
St Oswald’ church, Collingham, Wetherby

Derbyshire
 St Oswald's Church, Ashbourne

County Durham
 St Oswald's Church, a Grade II* listed church in Durham

Gloucestershire
 St Oswald's Church, Lassington

Hertfordshire
 St Oswald's Church, Croxley Green

Lancashire/Merseyside
 St Oswald's Church, Old Swan, Liverpool, Merseyside
 St Oswald's Church, Preesall, Lancashire
 St Oswald's Church, Warton, Lancashire

Nottinghamshire
 St Oswald's Church, East Stoke

West Midlands
 St Oswald's Church, Small Heath

Yorkshire
 St Oswald's Church, Askrigg, North Yorkshire
 Church of St Oswald, Filey, North Yorkshire
 St Oswald's Church, Fulford, North Yorkshire
 St Oswald's Church, Guiseley, West Yorkshire
 St Oswald's Church, Kirk Sandall, Doncaster, South Yorkshire
 Church of St Oswald, Lythe, North Yorkshire
 St Oswald’s Church, Oswaldkirk, North Yorkshire
 St Oswald's Church, Sowerby, North Yorkshire
 St Oswald's Church, Thornton in Lonsdale, North Yorkshire
 St Oswald's Church, Thornton Steward, North Yorkshire

Shropshire
 St Oswald's Church, Oswestry

United States
 St. Oswald's Protestant Episcopal Church, listed on the National Register of Historic Places in Atchison County, Missouri